Ocean development refers to the establishing of human activities at sea and use of the ocean, as well as its governance.

Politics 
Ocean development has been a central regulatory issue of the law of the sea. Particularly in regard of marine conservation, ocean development has been critically analyzed as engulfed in colonialist logic, broadening contemporarily regulatory discussion and measures.

The main international bodies of ocean governance are the International Maritime Organization, International Tribunal for the Law of the Sea and International Seabed Authority of the United Nations Convention on the Law of the Sea.

India 
There was a Ministry of Ocean Development in the Government of India, until 2006 when it became part of a larger Ministry of Earth Sciences.

Outline
 
 
 
 

 
 
 
 
 
 
 
 
 
 
 
 
 
 
 
 
 
 
 
 
 
 
 
 
 
 
 
 
 

 
 
 
 
 
 
 
 
 

 
 
 
 
 
 
 
 
 
 
 
 
 
 
 
 
 
 
 
 
 
 
 
 
 
 
 
 
 
 
 
 
 
 
 

 
  (specific )
 
 
 
 
 
 
 
  (FPSOs)

See also

References

Further reading 

 Ocean Development in India

Earth sciences
Oceans